Kamiel De Bruyne (born in 1992) is a Belgian television producer.    

De Bruyne is best known for creating the Emmy Award-winning Belgian TV-show Sorry voor alles ("Sorry about that").

Trivia
 In his spare time, De Bruyne draws on toilet paper on the train.
 In 2019 De Bruyne published a book, through publisher Van Halewyck, entitled "Fake It Till You Make It", a humorous guide to unseen success for unheard-of lazy people.

References

External links

1992 births
Living people
Belgian television producers